Chief Electoral Officer(India) is a statutory authority created for representing Election Commission of India for conducting elections in states and union territories of India. Constitution of India with introduction of Article 324 made the powers of Chief Electoral Officer(India) independent. Their duties and powers are bound under Section 13 A of Representation of the People Act, 1950 read with Section 20 of  Representation of the People Act, 1951.

History and Administration 
 
The role of Chief Electoral Officer(India) is highlighted under Section 13 A of Representation of the People Act, 1950 read with Section 20 of  Representation of the People Act, 1951 for performing the functions under the supervision and direction of Election Commission of India. Chief Electoral Officer is deputed by Election Commission of India in all states of India.

Roles and Responsibilities 

Chief Electoral Officer(India) roles and responsibilities are categorised under following heads:

Pre Election 

 Ensuring compliance of important activities which includes meeting with representatives of local political party, resolving their issues over updates in electoral rolls.
 Awareness of elections to general public through media. 
 Ensuring availability of stationary like indelible ink and rubber stamps.  
 Checking Electronic Voting Machines (EVMs) requirements and informing the Election Commission,. 
 Other ancillary activities required for conducting polls.
 Proper and timely printing of ballot papers. 
 Preparation of press note on election programmes and notifying it in the State Gazette. 
 Observing that Model Code of Conduct is followed and sending daily report to The Election Commission .
 Ensuring complaint monitoring system is in order. 
 Declaration of polling day as holiday, and 
 Ensuring sufficient poll observers are in state.

Law and Order Maintenance 

 Reviewing law and order situation is proper.
 Ensuring timely measures are taken through detailed assessment. 
 One of the most important areas of his role is maintaining  inter-state coordination and closing of state borders when needed. 
 Critical polling stations identification as per the guidelines of the Election Commission.
 Making vulnerability mapping of election areas prior to the elections after consulting local police officials and field officers.
 Assessing the availability and additional need of state police personnel and forces for security and sending  the requirement, if any to the Election Commission. 
 Ensuring plan for security deployment is as per Election Commission's directives. 
 Check functioning of Helpline and other Complaint Cell are operational at different levels in the state.

During Election 

 Primary responsibility is to inform Election Commission of India of commencement of polling at scheduled time.
 Sending Election Commission of statutory reports in prescribed formats on polling day at 1 pm and 7 pm and on subsequent day at 7 am.
 Ensuring arrangements are in place at polling booths and demonstration in all districts of state of Electronic Voting Machines. 
 Sealing of Electronic Voting Machines and election papers under his directions.  
 Recommending re-poll when needed. 
 In case of re-poll, primary task being to send proposals for re-poll schedule based on the returning officer scrutiny report.
 Arrangements for repoll based on guidelines of Election Commission.

Post Election 

 Main responsibility of informing district authorities of the date, time and place of counting. 
 Ensuring that candidates and their polling agents are informed of counting.
 Ensuring that counting personnel and trained and sufficient counting personnel are available.
 Making arrangements for free flow of information about results of various rounds of counting. 
 Ensuring availability of Additional counting staff, if needed.
 Making note of candidates election expenditure.
 Directing district electoral officer or the returning officer during important decisions. 
 Maintaining daily expenditure details from nomination date to the date of announcement of results.

Constitutional Requirements 

Chief Electoral Officer(India) are deputed in States and Union Territories of India by Election Commission of India under Section 13 A of Representation of the People Act, 1950 read with Section 20 of  Representation of the People Act, 1951 to act on their behalf during the elections.

Eligibility 

Following are the Eligibility for becoming Chief Electoral Officer:

 Must be Citizen of India.
 Should not hold office of profit.
 Should belong to Indian Administrative Services cadre.
 Should not be a member of any political party or affiliated to any political party during tenure as Chief Electoral Officer.
 Should not be serving in Financial Institution, Banking Institution or in Legal practice in Courts.

Chief Electoral Officers for States 

The following is the list of Chief Electoral Officers for States of India.

Related Links 

 Election Commission of India.
 State Election Commission in India

References

External links 
 Official Website

Elections in India
Local government in India